Al Fajr Al Jadid (Arabic; لفجر الجديد; The New Dawn) was a leftist magazine which was published in the period 1945–1946. Although the magazine was published for a short time, it is one of the sources that laid the basis of the regime change in Egypt in 1952.

History and profile
The first issue of Al Fajr Al Jadid appeared on 16 May 1945. The founders and contributors of the magazine were called the Al Fajr Al Jadid group and included Ahmad Sadiq Saad, Raymond Duwayk, Yusuf Darwish and Ahmad Rushdi Salih who was the editor-in-chief of the magazine. They were Marxist political figures and artists. The magazine was started to produce a version of the leftist views and practices specific to Egypt. It was started as a biweekly publication, but the frequency was switched to weekly from 1 November 1945. The frequent topics featured in the magazine were social issues such as poverty, underdevelopment and agrarian reform. It also covered literary and cultural writings and advocated the committed literary approach. These articles were published in standard Arabic not in colloquial Arabic.

The magazine was distributed to nearly all Arab countries and enjoyed support and financial assistance of the Marxist organizations based in Palestine, Syria, Lebanon and Iraq. It was also financed by the Soviet Union.

Al Fajr Al Jadid openly attacked significant cultural figures of the period, including Tawfiq Al Hakim, Abbas Al Aqqad, Ibrahim Al Mazini and Taha Hussein for living in their ivory towers and having close connections with capitalists and colonizers. In this regard the magazine shared a common feature with Al Adab, a literary magazine which would be launched in Beirut in 1953. Initially Al Fajr Al Jadid was not critical towards the Egyptian government, but became much more ardent opponent of the government soon which led to its closure in July 1946 by the government led by Prime Minister Ismail Sidky.

References

1945 establishments in Egypt
1946 disestablishments in Egypt
Arabic-language magazines
Banned magazines
Biweekly magazines published in Egypt
Censorship in Egypt
Defunct political magazines published in Egypt
Marxist magazines
Magazines established in 1945
Magazines disestablished in 1946
Weekly magazines published in Egypt